Scott Valentine may refer to:

 Scott Valentine (actor) (born 1958), American actor
 Scott Valentine (ice hockey) (born 1991), Canadian ice hockey defenceman